The Taipei Metro Danfeng station is a station on the Xinzhuang Line located on the border of Xinzhuang and Taishan District, New Taipei City, Taiwan. The station opened on 29 June 2013.

Station overview

This two-level, underground station has an island platform. It is located beneath the intersection of Zhongzheng Rd. and Min-an Rd.

The western terminus for the Xinzhuang Line was originally planned to be at Fu Jen University. However, the line was changed and further extended to the west. Thus, the station number used by the operator (O60) does not line up with the next station (Fu Jen University, O1).

Construction
Excavation depth for this station is around 19 meters. It is 150 meters in length and 16.55 meters wide. It has two entrances, one accessibility elevator, and two vent shafts. It also has one emergency exit.

Station layout

Around the station	
B&Q, Xinzhuang Store	
Fu-Ying Junior High School	
 Lee-Ming Institute of Technology

References

Railway stations opened in 2013
Zhonghe–Xinlu line stations
2013 establishments in Taiwan